Levkin is a rural locality (a village) in Niginskoye Rural Settlement, Nikolsky District, Vologda Oblast, Russia. The population was 44 as of 2002.

Geography 
The distance to Nikolsk is 24 km, to Nigino is 6 km. Koshelevo is the nearest rural locality.

References 

Rural localities in Nikolsky District, Vologda Oblast